Geoffrey Salmons (born 14 January 1948) is an English former footballer who played for Chesterfield, Leicester City, Sheffield United and Stoke City as a midfielder.

Career
Salmons was born in Mexborough and joined Sheffield United as a schoolboy and made his league debut at West Bromwich Albion on 30 September 1967. He became a regular starter under manager John Harris at the end of the 1960s and played 31 times in 1970–71 helping the "Blades" gain promotion to the First Division. Salmons and Sheffield United adapted to life in the top tier well finishing in mid table three seasons in a row. After making 204 appearances for the Bramall Lane side he moved to Stoke City for a fee of £160,000. Salmons' first season at the Victoria Ground saw Stoke come within four points of winning the title and play Ajax in the UEFA Cup. In January 1976 a severe storm in Stoke-on-Trent saw the Victoria Ground badly damaged and as a result the club had to sell their players to fund the repair costs.

A weakened Stoke side were relegated in 1976–77 and Salmons re-joined Sheffield United on loan, playing five matches before signing for Leicester City for £45,000. He spent one season at Filbert Street scoring four goals in 28 matches before leaving for Chesterfield. He spent four seasons with the "Spireites" scoring 19 goals in 153 appearances helping them to win the Anglo-Scottish Cup in 1981 1980–81. He later played for non-league Gainsborough Trinity and after he ended his playing career he went on to run his own pub in his native Mexborough.

Career statistics
Source:

A.  The "Other" column constitutes appearances and goals in the Anglo-Scottish Cup, Football League Group Cup, Texaco Cup, UEFA Cup and Watney Cup.

References

External links
 Profile of Geoff Salmons

1948 births
Living people
People from Mexborough
Footballers from Doncaster
English footballers
Association football wingers
Sheffield United F.C. players
Stoke City F.C. players
Leicester City F.C. players
Chesterfield F.C. players
Gainsborough Trinity F.C. players
English Football League players